Chemokine like receptor 1  also known as ChemR23 (Chemerin Receptor 23) is a protein that in humans is encoded by the CMKLR1 gene. Chemokine receptor-like 1 is a G protein-coupled receptor for the chemoattractant adipokine chemerin and the omega-3 fatty acid eicosapentaenoic acid-derived specialized pro-resolving molecule, resolvin E1 (see Specialized proresolving mediators#EPA-derived resolvins (i.e. RvE)). The murine receptor that shares almost 80% homology with the human receptor, is called Dez.

Tissue distribution 

CMKLR1 shows wide RNA expression profile but is notably high in plasmacytoid dendritic cells, macrophages, cardiomyocytes, adipocytes and endothelial cells.

Function 

Activating CMKLR1 by an agonist mobilizes intracellular calcium and causes the activation of several other signaling cascades like the ERK1 and NF-κB. Initial studies of CMKLR1 suggested that it might have a role in the inflammatory pathways. Its cognate ligand, chemerin was found in joint aspirate from rheumatoid arthritis and absent in aspirate from degenerative arthritis. CMKLR1 expression by plasmacytoid dendritic cells and macrophages also helped foster this idea. In vitro chemotaxis assays showed it to be utilized in attracting these cells. As an adipokine receptor it has a role in adipogenesis and adipocyte maturation. It seems also to have a role in peripheral insulin resistance.

Also studies using the mouse zymosan model and chemerin peptides showed that these peptides suppressed and helped resolve the peritonitis in mice. The same model showed that this particular molecule enhances macrophage efferocytosis (phagocyting apoptotic cells).

Receptor antagonist CCX832 
CCX832 is an orally active molecule used as a tool compound in experimental pharmacology. It antagonises the effect of CMKLR1. It is listed on the Guide to Pharmacology database as the only example of a CMKLR1 antagonist. Its chemical structure is undisclosed.

The substance was originally developed for use as a pharmaceutical drug against inflammatory diseases by ChemoCentryx, a pharmaceutical firm based in California, in alliance with GlaxoSmithKline (GSK). Development was terminated after a Phase I clinical trial in 2012.

References

External links

Further reading 

 
 
 
 

Chemokine receptors